Shunping County is a rural county in the west-central part of Hebei province, China. It is under the administration of the prefecture-level city of Baoding and lies to the west of its urban core.

History
Under the Han, Shunping was known as Quni. It was a base for Chen Xi's general Wang Huang (t s Wáng Huáng) in his short-lived rebellion and the site of the defeat and executions of Wang and Hou Chang ( Hóu Chǎng) by Guan Ying and other imperial forces in 196BC.

It was renamed Shunping under Wang Mang's short-lived Xin Dynasty.

Administrative divisions
Towns:
Puyang, Gaoyupu, Yaoshan

Townships:
Pushang Township, Baiyun Township, Hekou Township, Anyang Township, Taiyu Township, Dabei Township, Shennan Township

Climate

References

Citations

Bibliography
.

 
Geography of Baoding
County-level divisions of Hebei